The Spring Valley Public Library is a library in Spring Valley, Minnesota. It is a member of Southeastern Libraries Cooperating, the SE Minnesota library region.

The building, an example of Beaux Arts Classicism, is listed on the National Register of Historic Places. It is a single-story brick building on a raised Kasota stone basement. It was completed in 1904 with funding from an $8,000 Carnegie grant.

References

External links 
 Spring Valley Public Library website

Southeastern Libraries Cooperating
Buildings and structures in Fillmore County, Minnesota
Education in Fillmore County, Minnesota
Carnegie libraries in Minnesota